Maxime Dominguez (born 1 February 1996) is a Swiss professional footballer who currently plays as a midfielder for Miedź Legnica.

Club career 
Starting off his professional career with Servette FC in 2013, Dominguez represented three other clubs in Switzerland - FC Zurich, FC Lausanne-Sport, and Neuchatel Xamax. 

In June 2021, following the decision to not extend his contract with Neuchâtel Xamax, he left Switzerland to join Polish I liga side Miedź Legnica. On 10 July 2021, he signed a two-year deal with the club.

Personal life 
Dominguez is of Spanish descent.

Honours
Miedź Legnica
I liga: 2021–22

References

External links 
 
Maxime Dominguez at Neuchâtel Xamax

1996 births
Living people
Swiss men's footballers
Switzerland youth international footballers
Swiss people of Spanish descent
Association football midfielders
Swiss Super League players
I liga players
Ekstraklasa players
Servette FC players
FC Zürich players
FC Lausanne-Sport players
Miedź Legnica players
Footballers from Geneva
Swiss expatriate sportspeople in Poland
Expatriate footballers in Poland